The Canadian province of Manitoba held municipal elections on October 27, 2010. Election day was on July 23, 2010 for several beach resorts including Winnipeg Beach, Dunnottar and Victoria Beach. Mayors, councillors, and school board trustees were elected.

Bill 35, The Municipal Conflict of Interest and Campaign Financing Act, was passed on October 8, 2009. This created new rules for campaigns and financing. It extended campaign rules previously in force in Winnipeg to the rest of the province. It requires candidates to provide financial statements of contributions and expenses. It also bans corporate and union donations, and limits donations to Manitoba residents. Municipalities had the option to set their own bylaw regarding maximum expenses, and municipal rebate programs.

Also new in this election is the requirement that candidates register prior to campaigning. Candidates for mayor or reeve were required to register between May 1, and September 21, 2010. Candidates for councillor had to register between June 30 to September 21, 2010.

Brandon

Mayor

City council

Wards

Not running

Dauphin

Mayor

City council

At-large

Morden

Mayor

City council

At-large

Portage la Prairie

Mayor

City council

At-large

School trustee

Not running
John Harrison - resigned December 2009, seat not filled.
Allen Dell.

Selkirk

Mayoral candidates

City council

At-large

Steinbach

Mayoral candidates

City council

At-large

 Penalty for failure to submit finances is disqualification from running in the 2014 Manitoba municipal election

Not running
(incumbent) Elbert Toews
(incumbent) Art Rempel

Thompson

Mayoral candidates

Total Votes 3,535

City council

At-large

Not running
Harold Smith
Oswald Sawh

Winkler

Mayor

City council

At-large

Winnipeg

Mayoral candidates

City council

Wards

Not running
Mike O'Shaughnessy (retired)
Lillian Thomas (retired)
Bill Clement (deceased)
Harry Lazarenko (retired)

See also
2006 Manitoba Municipal Elections Results

References
http://tech-fame.blogspot.com

External links
 Manitoba Municipal Elections
 Association of Manitoba Municipalities Election 2010
 Brandon Votes 2010
 Winnipeg City Election

Municipal elections in Manitoba
2010 elections in Canada
2010 in Manitoba
October 2010 events in Canada